This is a list of toponyms named after or connected with Prince Marko.


Named
  Kula Kraljevića Marka (Tower of Prince Marko) near Višegrad;
 Markovo sedalo, a chair-shaped boulder near the tower;
 Markove stope (Marko's footprints), indentations in the stone;
 Other indentations in the stone were explained as hoofprints of Marko's horse Šarac. The three were destroyed while building a railway. The Šarac's hoofprints are mentioned in the opening of Ivo Andrić's novel Bridge Over the Drina.
  Markov kamen (Marko's stone), a boulder on Miroč mountain. The boulder had a hoof-shaped indentation explained as hoofprint of Marko's horse Šarac.
  Markov kamen (Marko's stone), a boulder on Kopaonik mountain.
  Markov kamen (Marko's stone), near Konavle, on hill between Cavtat and Konavle
  Stope Kraljevića Marka (Marko's footprints), near Trpanj
  Markov kamen (Marko's Stone), a mountain peak in Montenegro near Bijelo Polje.
  Markov kamen - Mečji vrh (Marko's Stone - Bear Sow's peak), a forest in Boljevac Municipality
  Markov kamen (Marko's Stone) or Markov val, a stećak near Žabljak, explained as being the gravestone of Marko.
  Markov manastir (Marko's Monastery), a monastery built by Marko.
  Markov točak (Marko's spring), a spring in the village of Prpe near Banjaluka. Explained as created by Marko when he threw a huge stone there.
  Markova crkva (Marko's church) or Markova peštera (Marko's Cave), remains of a church built in a cave church near the Babuna river near Veles.
  Markova Crkva (Marko's Church), a village and its church in the Lajkovac Municipality. Named by monks who escaped from the Marko's monastery.
  Markova noga (Marko's Leg), the southernmost point of North Macedonia.
  Markova stolica (Marko's Chair), a small plateau on Vidrak hill near Valjevo. Explained as created by Marko when he sat to rest on the mountain while cooling his feet in the river Kolubara.
  Markovi Kuli (Marko's Towers), a fortress where Marko lived.
  Markovo kale, a fortress ruin near Vranje.

Related
  Musov grob (Musa's Grave) near Stenkovec, explained as the place of the fight between Marko and Musa the Robber.
  Šarčeva kopita (Šarac's hooves) in Sarajevo.
  Šuplji kamen (Hollow stone), a boulder with a hole near the village of Spaj; the hole is explained as made by Marko with his mace.

References

Lists of places named after people